Bahl is an Indian (Khatri) surname. It is also a German surname of unrelated origin. Notable people with the name include:

Camille Bahl (born 1999), French gymnast
Gayatri Patel Bahl (born 1987), Indian Bollywood actress
Jitin Bahl (born 1975), English cricketer
Jordy Bahl, American softball player
Kali Charan Bahl, linguist, University of Chicago professor emeritus 
Karm Narayan Bahl (1891–1954), Indian zoologist
Kevin Bahl (born 2000), Canadian ice hockey player
Kunal Bahl, Indian e-commerce entrepreneur
Mohnish Bahl, Indian film and television actor
Om P. Bahl (1927–2004), Indian–American molecular biologist
Raghav Bahl, Indian businessman and owner of TV channels
Victor Bahl, American computer scientist
Vickram Bahl (born 1964), Indian television personality
Vikas Bahl, Indian film producer and director

Fictional characters
 Ricky Bahl, character from the 2011 Indian film Ladies vs Ricky Bahl
 Saanvi Bahl, character from the 2018 TV show Manifest

Indian surnames
Surnames of Indian origin
Punjabi-language surnames
Hindu surnames
Khatri clans
Khatri surnames